Persid may refer to:

anything of or relating to Persis
certain languages of the southwestern branch of the Western Iranian languages